Tom Stagg may refer to:
 Tom Stagg (judge)
 Tom Stagg (footballer)